Angiolino Giuseppe Pasquale Ventura (14 July 1919 – 22 October 1987), known as Lino Ventura, was an Italian actor who grew up in France and starred in many French films. Born in Italy, he was raised in Paris by his mother. After a first career as a professional wrestler was ended by injury, he was offered a part as a gang boss in the Jacques Becker film Touchez pas au grisbi (1954) and rapidly became one of France's favourite film actors, playing opposite many other great stars and working with such leading directors as Louis Malle, Claude Sautet, and Claude Miller.

Usually portraying a tough man, either a criminal or a cop, he also featured as a leader of the Resistance in the Jean-Pierre Melville directed Army of Shadows (L'armée des ombres, 1969). After one of his four children, a daughter, was born handicapped, he and his wife founded a charity  Perce-Neige (Snowdrop) which aids disabled children and their parents. He was voted 23rd in a poll for the 100 greatest Frenchmen.

Life and career

Early life
Born in Parma, Emilia-Romagna, Italy to Giovanni Ventura and Luisa Borrini, who moved to France soon thereafter, Lino dropped out of school at the age of eight and later took on a variety of jobs. At one point Ventura was pursuing a prizefighting and professional wrestling career but had to end it because of an injury.

Early roles
In 1953, by chance, one of his friends mentioned him to Jacques Becker who was looking for an Italian actor to play opposite Jean Gabin in a gangster movie called Touchez pas au grisbi (1954). Becker offered him on the spot the role of Angelo, which Ventura refused at first but then accepted. He had such a presence in the film that the whole profession took notice. The film was a big success.

Ventura started to build up an acting career in similar hard-boiled gangster films, often playing beside his friend Jean Gabin, including his second film, Razzia sur la chnouf (1955).

He followed it with Law of the Streets (1956), Crime and Punishment (1956) with Gabin.

Later career

Some of his most famous roles include the portrait of corrupt police chief Tiger Brown in The Threepenny Opera (1963) and mob boss Vito Genovese in The Valachi Papers (1972).

Although he remained an Italian citizen throughout his life and long used to seeing himself dubbed into Italian from the original French release, he only made a handful of films in his native language, among them The Last Judgement (Il giudizio universale, 1961), Illustrious Corpses (Cadaveri eccellenti, 1976) and Cento Giorni a Palermo (1983).

Ventura remained active until the year before his death from a heart attack in 1987 at the age of 68. Having a disabled daughter himself, he created a charitable foundation, Perce-Neige (Snowdrop) in 1966, which supports disabled people.

Throughout his career, he was one of the most popular actors of French cinema. He spoke French without any accent (excepting a Parisian one at the beginning of his career) and spoke Italian with a slight French accent, having arrived in France at the age of seven. Forcibly conscripted into the Italian army during the Second World War, he deserted. But, although his wife and four children were French, he never wanted to give up Italian citizenship, out of respect for his parents. Despite this, he was ranked 23rd of the 100 greatest Frenchmen, 17 years after his death.

Somewhat paradoxically, Ventura attributed his great success to his limited range as an actor; and often said "If I cannot believe in a character, or if something does not ring true, I cannot act it."

In a 1980 interview he said that the previous year "I began to realize how incredibly lucky I had been since the age of 9, how much I had been loved by so many people. When I act, I am doing what I love, and I am paid for it. So I put myself in the service of the film, never the film in service to me." He mentioned he turned down several roles - a part in Apocalypse Now (cut from the final film), a role in a Robert Aldrich film and the part played by François Truffaut in Close Encounters of the Third Kind.

He said, "The story is everything. My good friend Jean Gabin told me 25 years ago there are three important things in movies: the story, the story and the story."

"I have limitations," he said. "I have no training; I could not do the classics. What I can do is myself. And I like best not to talk at all... I study the script, and then try to become the character. That is very mysterious, how that happens. I cannot explain it. There are so many mysteries in cinema, the way everything must interlock, that when you think of it all, you never want to make a film."

Filmography

References

Further reading
 Durant, Philippe (1989): Lino Ventura. Bergisch Gladbach: Lübbe. 
 Durieux, Gilles (2001): Lino Ventura. Paris: Flammarion. 
 Giovanni, José (2002): Mes Grandes Gueules. Fayard. 
 Ventura, Clélia (2003): Lino ou la Gourmandise de la Vie. Paris: Robert Laffont. 
 Ventura, Odette (1992): Lino. Paris: Robert Laffont.  (see also: External Links)
 Ventura, Odette (1993): Lino. Weinheim; Berlin: Beltz Quadriga. 
 Ventura, Odette (1997): Lino. Paris: Robert Laffont. 
 Ventura, Odette (1997): Lino. Guanda "Biblioteca della Pilotta". ISBN
 Zurhorst, Meinolf / Just, Lothar (1984). Lino Ventura: Seine Filme – Sein Leben. München: Heyne.

External links

 
http://tontonsflingueurs.actifforum.com/ French Site Lino Ventura
 Les Premières Rencontres Nationales – Art, Culture et Handicap – Bourges du 19 au 21 octobre 2003
 Rencontres – Art, Culture et Handicap – Lundi 20 octobre à Bourges
 Lino Ventura Foundation
Box office figures for Lino Ventura films at Box Office Story

1919 births
1987 deaths
Italian emigrants to France
Italian male film actors
French male film actors
Male actors from Paris
20th-century French male actors
20th-century Italian male actors